Majeti Fetrie (born 12 June 1974) is a Ghanaian Weightlifter. He competed in the men's 77 kg event at the 2006 Commonwealth Games where he won a gold medal.

References 

1974 births
Living people
Ghanaian male weightlifters
Commonwealth Games gold medallists for Ghana
Weightlifters at the 2006 Commonwealth Games
Commonwealth Games medallists in weightlifting
20th-century Ghanaian people
21st-century Ghanaian people
Medallists at the 2006 Commonwealth Games